Yongning is a town under the administration of Cangxi County, Sichuan, China. , it has one residential community and 10 villages under its administration.

References 

Township-level divisions of Sichuan
Cangxi County